Capitol Critters is an American animated sitcom about the lives of mice, rats and roaches who reside in the basement and walls of the White House in Washington, D.C. The series was produced by Steven Bochco Productions and Hanna-Barbera in association with 20th Century Fox Television for ABC, which aired seven out of the show's 13 episodes from January 28 to March 14, 1992. Cartoon Network later aired all 13 episodes (including the unaired episodes) from 1995 through 1996.

The series was part of a spate of attempts by major networks to develop prime time animated shows to compete with the success of Fox's The Simpsons, alongside CBS's Fish Police and Family Dog.  The latter two, along with Capitol Critters, proved unsuccessful and were quickly cancelled.

Premise 
A young mouse named Max is forced to flee his home on a farm in Nebraska after his family is killed by exterminators. He travels to Washington, D.C. to live with his hippie cousin Berkley, rebellious rat Jammett, and Jammett's mother Trixie. Max also befriends a hip cockroach named Moze and a former laboratory rat named Muggle who still suffers from the side effects of the experiments he is put through that often have him exploding.

The group has to deal with the White House's resident cats, which are caricatures of then-President George H. W. Bush and Vice President Dan Quayle. The episodes' themes reference current issues of the day, including gun control and drug abuse.

Voice Cast 
 Neil Patrick Harris as Max
 Charlie Adler as Jammet
 Patti Deutsch as Trixie
 Jennifer Darling as Berkeley
 Dorian Harewood as Moze
 Bobcat Goldthwait as Muggle
 Frank Welker as Presidential Cats

Additional voices 

 Lewis Arquette
 Michael Bell as Roach Husband, Various
 Gregg Berger
 Earl Boen
 Sorrell Booke
 Hamilton Camp
 Brian Cummings
 Jim Cummings as Cockroach Gang Leader (in "Hat and Mouse"), Various
 Tim Curry as Senator (in "Max Goes To Washington")
 Jeff Doucette
 Nancy Dussault
 Paul Eiding as Max's Father (in "Max Goes to Washington")
 Richard Erdman
 Takayo Fischer as Kazuko (in "A Little Romance")
 Linda Gary
 Joan Gerber as Roach Wife
 Ed Gilbert
 Dan Gilvezan
 Danny Goldman as Opie the Squirrel (in "Opie's Choice")
 Arlene Golonka
 David Graham
 Whitby Hertford
 Gordon Hunt
 Helen Hunt
 Robert Ito as Ichiro (in "A Little Romance")
 Nick Jameson
 David Jolliffe
 Janice Kawaye as Miko (in "A Little Romance")
 Tony Lamond
 Steve Landesberg
 Jarrett Lennon
 Anndi McAfee
 Scott Menville
 Brian Stokes Mitchell
 Rob Paulsen as Janitor, Pigeon (in "The KiloWatts Riots"), Various
 Robert Picardo
 Noam Pitlik
 Don Reed
 Peter Renaday
 Ariana Richards as President's Granddaughter (in "If Lovin' You Is Wrong, I Don't Wanna Be Rat")
 Robert Ridgely
 Neil Ross as Newscaster
 Beverly Sanders
 Pamela Segall as Violet (in "If Lovin' You Is Wrong, I Don't Wanna Be Rat")
 Jeffrey Tambor
 Mark L. Taylor
 Russi Taylor as Bluebird (in "Into the Woods")
 Marcelo Tubert
 Chick Vennera
 B.J. Ward as Max's Mother (in "Max Goes to Washington")
 Lee Wilkof
 Eugene Williams
 Patty Wirtz
 Bill Woodson
 Patric Zimmerman as Felix (in "The Rat to Bear Arms")

Episodes

Reception 
Capitol Critters was cancelled after less than two months. In its short run, the series dealt with such topics as politics, racial segregation, drug addiction, and mortality. In his review of the series, Variety critic Brian Lowry wrote that "at its best, the show seems to ape the work of film director Ralph Bakshi by using an animated setting to explore adult themes", and that "the bland central character and cartoonish elements [...] will likely be off-putting to many adults, who won't find the political satire biting enough to merit their continued attention. Similarly, kids probably won't be as smitten with the cartoon aspects or look." Capitol Critters had their own Burger King Kids Club toys in 1992, which featured Jammet, Max, Muggle, and a Presidential Cat sitting on or emerging from miniature Washington D.C. monuments.

References

External links 

 
 Capitol Critters at the Big Cartoon Database

1992 American television series debuts
1992 American television series endings
1990s American adult animated television series
1990s American political comedy television series
1990s American satirical television series
1990s American sitcoms
American adult animated comedy television series
American animated sitcoms
American Broadcasting Company original programming
English-language television shows
Political satirical television series
Television series by Hanna-Barbera
Television series by 20th Century Fox Television
Television series created by Steven Bochco
Animated television series about mice and rats
Television shows set in Nebraska
Television shows set in Washington, D.C.